Parapat is a small town in North Sumatra province on the edge of Lake Toba, on the Uluan Peninsula where it forms the narrowest eastern link to Samosir Island.  It is the primary transit point by ferry for visitors going to Samosir Island.
Administratively it is part of Simalungun Regency.

Administrative Districts
Parapat consists of the following villages:
 Bangun Dolok
 Buntu Pasir
 Parapat

Port 

From Parapat itself there is a ferry port that serves water transportation to Samosir Island to be precise to the Ajibata port. If not through Parapat, then to reach Samosir Island via land transportation one has to circle the shores of Lake Toba to Pangururan because that is where Samosir Island is connected to the mainland of Sumatra Island.

Parapat is very famous for the beauty of Lake Toba. This city is a famous tourist attraction in North Sumatra. In fact, in the 1990s, to be precise before 1997, this city became a favorite destination for foreign tourists, especially those from the Netherlands, Malaysia, Singapore, Germany, Japan, Korea, and some even from America. However, in 1997, there was a financial crisis that made tourists reluctant to travel to this place. However, the Parapat community and the government are struggling to advance Parapat tourism.

Transportation
Sisingamangaraja XII International Airport is located about 47 mi (76 km) distance from Parapat town. It is also connected via Trans-Sumatran Highway to Pematang Siantar by a 48 km road.

Places of interest
 Batu Gantung (Hanging Stone)
 Sukarno's house when in exile
 Parapat Ferry Harbour

Lake Toba
Populated places in North Sumatra
Tourism in Indonesia